Jean-Charles, comte Monnier (22 March 1758 in Cavaillon – 29 January 1816 in Paris), was a French infantry commander during the French Revolutionary Wars and the Hundred Days. Monnier's name is inscribed on the Arc de Triomphe as 'Monier'.

References 

French military personnel of the French Revolutionary Wars
French Republican military leaders of the French Revolutionary Wars
French military personnel of the Napoleonic Wars
Knights of the Order of Saint Louis
Commandeurs of the Légion d'honneur
1758 births
1816 deaths
People from Vaucluse
Peers of France
Names inscribed under the Arc de Triomphe